was a Japanese football player. He played for Japan national team.

Club career
Takabayashi was born in Saitama on August 2, 1931. After graduating from Rikkyo University, he played for Tanabe Pharmaceutical. He also played for Osaka SC.

National team career
In March 1954, when Takabayashi was a Rikkyo University student, he was selected Japan national team for 1954 World Cup qualification. At this qualification, on March 14, he debuted against South Korea. In May, he played at 1954 Asian Games and scored 2 goals. In 1956, he was selected Japan for 1956 Summer Olympics, but he did not compete. He also played at 1958 Asian Games. He played 9 games and scored 2 goals for Japan until 1954.

On December 27, 2009, Takabayashi died of heart failure in Saitama at the age of 78.

National team statistics

References

External links

 
 Japan National Football Team Database

1931 births
2009 deaths
Rikkyo University alumni
Association football people from Saitama Prefecture
Japanese footballers
Japan international footballers
Tanabe Mitsubishi Pharma SC players
Olympic footballers of Japan
Footballers at the 1956 Summer Olympics
Footballers at the 1954 Asian Games
Footballers at the 1958 Asian Games
Association football midfielders
Asian Games competitors for Japan